Prince Amanda (born 23 March 2001) is a professional soccer player. He has received call-ups to training camps for the Canadian youth national teams.

Early life
Amanda was born in Tanzania, where his family was living in a refugee camp after fleeing the Democratic Republic of Congo due to the civil war. He and his family immigrated to Canada when he was eight, where he grew up in Edmonton.

Amanda began playing organized football with Sherwood Park SA. At age twelve, Amanda switched to Edmonton Xtreme FC. In 2015, Amanda joined the academy program of FC Edmonton.

Club career
On 15 February 2019, Amanda signed his first professional contract with Edmonton ahead of the club's first season in the Canadian Premier League. On 16 October 2019, Amanda made his debut as a starter in a 3–1 win over Pacific FC, in which he scored the opening goal and assisted on another. After the 2020 season, his contract option for 2021 was not picked up making him a free agent. After having discussions to join another CPL club in 2021, on October 1, 2021, he ultimately re-joined FC Edmonton for the remainder of the 2021 season, with contract options for 2022 and 2023. On February 9, 2022, the club announced that Amanda and all but two other players would not be returning for the 2022 season.

International career
In 2014, Amanda participated in a Canadian national team U-14 identification camp.

Personal
His older brother Gloire is also a professional soccer player.

References

External links

2001 births
Living people
People from Kigoma Region
Tanzanian people of Democratic Republic of the Congo descent
Tanzanian emigrants to Canada
Naturalized citizens of Canada
Soccer players from Edmonton
Association football forwards
Canadian soccer players
FC Edmonton players
Canadian Premier League players